This is a list of films produced in Sweden and in the Swedish language in the 1980s. For an A-Z see :Category:Swedish films.

1980s

External links
 Swedish film at the Internet Movie Database

1980s
Films
Swedish